The 2013 Rally Sweden was a motor racing event for rally cars that was held over four days between 7 and 10 February, which marked the sixty-first running of the Rally Sweden. The rally was based in the town of Karlstad and ran along the border of Norway.

The rally was the second round of the 2013 World Rally Championship season, and marked the fortieth anniversary of the World Rally Championship. Twenty World Rally Car crews were entered in the event, including the defending World Drivers' Champion Sébastien Loeb.


Entry list
Twenty World Rally Cars were entered into the event, as were thirteen entries in the newly formed WRC-2 championship for cars built to Group N and Super 2000 regulations. There were no WRC-3 entries.

Itinerary
The itinerary for the 2013 rally sees a mixture of the same stages from 2012. The first stage will be a Super Special Stage held at the rally base in Karlstad. WRC fans had the chance to vote on the Rally Sweden Facebook page as to who they wanted to see starting the rally head-to-head. The majority of fans voted for French Sébastien Loeb vs Sébastien Ogier who are bitter rivals from when Ogier was the number two driver at Citroën. Other 'dream heats' include Finns Mikko Hirvonen and Jari-Matti Latvala going head-to-head as well as two young Scandinavian drivers Mads Østberg vs Pontus Tidemand.

The first full day of the rally will be made up of seven special stages to the north of the rally base, mostly taking place in the region of Hagfors. Stages four and seven take place near Torsby. The day ends with the second and final running of the Karlstad Super Special Stage.

Day two will have eight stages across the region of Hagfors. Day three starts with the longest stage of the rally which is the  stage of Mitandersfors near the region of Torsby and crosses the border into Norway. The next four stages take place near the Norwegian town of Kirkenær while the final stage of the day goes back to Sweden, taking place in Torsby which is also the Power Stage.

In detail

Results

Event standings

Notable retirements

Special stages

Notes:
 — The Mitandersfors stage started in Sweden and finished in Norway.

References

External links
 Rally official website
 The official website of the World Rally Championship
 Results at eWRC.com

Sweden
Rally
Swedish Rally